The Trinidad All-Steel Pan Percussion Orchestra (TASPO) was formed to participate in the Festival of Britain in 1951. The group was the first steelband to travel abroad from Trinidad and Tobago, presenting the newly invented steelpan to an international audience.

Members
Lieutenant Joseph Nathaniel Griffith was the conductor of the band. Griffith was originally part of the Trinidad Police Band.

On 6 July 1951, TASPO left Trinidad for England on the SS San Mateo. Carlton "Sonny" Roach fell ill and was left behind in Martinique. The steelband performed at the South Bank, London, on 26 July 1951, as well as elsewhere in Britain and in Paris. TASPO returned to Trinidad on 12 December 1951, the only exception being Sterling Betancourt, who stayed in London. Betancourt has been vitally involved in building up Notting Hill Carnival.

Readings
 Felix I. R. Blake, The Trinidad and Tobago Steel Pan. History and Evolution.  
 Stephen Stuempfle, The Steelband Movement: The Forging of a National Art in Trinidad and Tobago (Philadelphia: University of Pennsylvania Press, 1995).

Notes

References

External links
 http://www.bestoftrinidad.com/steelband50s.html "Steelband 1950 - 1959"]
 http://www.calypsoworld.org/uk/taspo.htm 
 YouTube clip from BBC2 documentary "The 1951 Festival of Britain - A Brave New World" (broadcast on Saturday 24 September 2011) with Sterling Betancourt talking about TASPO.
 Terry Joseph, "MBE for pan pioneer Betancourt honoured by Queen", Pantrinbago, 31 December 2001
 http://www.panonthenet.com/upclose/steelbands-of-newyork/orman-patsy-haynes.htm

Trinidad and Tobago musical groups
Musical groups established in 1951
Steelbands
1951 establishments in Trinidad and Tobago